Lonesome Luke Lolls in Luxury is a 1916 American short comedy film featuring Harold Lloyd. It was a silent film.

Cast
 Harold Lloyd - Lonesome Luke
 Gene Marsh
 Snub Pollard
 Bebe Daniels

See also
 Harold Lloyd filmography

References

External links

1916 films
1916 comedy films
Silent American comedy films
American black-and-white films
1916 short films
American silent short films
Films directed by Hal Roach
Lonesome Luke films
American comedy short films
1910s American films